Catascopia is a genus of air-breathing freshwater snails, aquatic pulmonate gastropod mollusks in the family Lymnaeidae, the pond snails.

Species 
The genus Catascopia includes:
 Catascopia occulta (Jackiewicz, 1959) – synonym Stagnicola occultus (Jackiewicz, 1959)
 Catascopia catascopium
 Catascopia emarginata
 Catascopia elodes

References

External links 
 BioInfoBAnk info

Lymnaeidae